The Tony Years is a book by British satirist, Craig Brown.

2007 non-fiction books
Books by Craig Brown (satirist)
Ebury Publishing books